Members of the Legislative Assembly (MLAs;) are representatives elected by the voters to the Northern Ireland Assembly.

About 
The Northern Ireland Assembly has 90 elected members – five from each of 18 constituencies, the boundaries of which are the same as those used for electing members of the UK Parliament. Its role is primarily to scrutinise and make decisions on the issues dealt with by Government Departments and to consider and make legislation.

Responsibilities 
MLAs are responsible for the Northern Ireland Assembly.

Salary
The basic salary for an MLA is £55,000, while the Speaker, ministers and committee chairs receive an additional 'Office Holders Salary' on top of their basic salary.

History

Previous similar legislators 
From 22 June 1921 until 30 March 1972 MPs of the House of Commons of Northern Ireland and Senators of the Senate of Northern Ireland in the Parliament of Northern Ireland legislated for Northern Ireland like MLAs do today.

Northern Ireland Assembly legislators 
Following a referendum on the Belfast Agreement on 23 May 1998 and the granting of Royal Assent to the Northern Ireland Act 1998 on 19 November 1998; a Northern Ireland Assembly and Northern Ireland Executive were established by the Labour government of Prime Minister Tony Blair. The process was known as devolution and was set up to give Northern Ireland devolved legislative powers. MLAs are responsible for the Northern Ireland Assembly.

2017 Northern Ireland Assembly election 
The Assembly Members (Reduction of Numbers) Act (Northern Ireland) 2016 resulted in the number of MLAs being reduced from 108 to 90. This change was first implemented in the snap Assembly election in March 2017.

Members of the Legislative Assembly 
 Members of the Northern Ireland Assembly elected in 2022
 Members of the Northern Ireland Assembly elected in 2017
 Members of the Northern Ireland Assembly elected in 2016
 Members of the Northern Ireland Assembly elected in 2011
 Members of the Northern Ireland Assembly elected in 2007
 Members of the Northern Ireland Assembly elected in 2003
 Members of the Northern Ireland Assembly elected in 1998
 Members of the Northern Ireland Assembly elected in 1982
 Members of the Northern Ireland Assembly elected in 1973

See also 
 Northern Ireland Assembly
 Northern Ireland Executive
 Member of Parliament
 Member of the Scottish Parliament
Member of the Senedd

References

External links 
 Northern Ireland Assembly

Northern Ireland Assembly